Lone Well Creek is a stream in the U.S. state of South Dakota.

Lone Well Creek received its name from a pioneer's well near its course.

See also
List of rivers of South Dakota

References

Rivers of Fall River County, South Dakota
Rivers of South Dakota